Nathalie Maleux (born July 4, 1973, in Waremme) is a Belgian television presenter and journalist. Since April 2007, she has served as head presenter for La Une.

References 

1973 births
Living people
Belgian journalists